Mirosław Kępiński  (born 27 July 1980 in Mława, Poland), known by his stage name Miro Kepinski, is a Polish film composer, music producer, and performer. Graduating from a Classical Music school in Mlawa, Poland as Musician Instrumentalist (Classical Guitar), he then expanded his musical knowledge by enrolling at the Jazz faculty of the Academy of Music in Katowice, Poland, graduating with the title ‘Bachelor of Art’. Miro has gone on to enjoy a career playing a broad palette of musical styles including classical, rock and electronic. Miro composes mainly for film and his compositions can be heard in productions all over the world from Sydney to Los Angeles. His most recent credits include the multiple-award-winning feature documentary 'The Wounds We Cannot See' by Alexander Freeman, drama 'In This Gray Place' by R.D.Womack II and a dark-comedy, horror 'Suicide for Beginners' by Craig Thieman. His music mixes minimalism with a ‘rawness’ of the north and a Slavic melancholy blended with the classic sounds.

MIRO 
In 2014, Kepinski founded a post-rock, ambient solo music project where he played the electric guitar. On March 6, 2015 MIRO has released a 5-track maxi single Be There. Track 'Be There' [original mix] was mixed by Aaron Harris, an acclaimed mixing engineer and  ex-drummer of Isis and mastered by Maor Appelbaum.

Tanana 
In 2015, Miro founded an electronic music project called Tanana. Tanana's debut EP, Star, was released on December 18, 2015. In 2016 Miro teamed up with a vocalist Steve Krolikowski from ex-band Repeater and Fear and the Nervous System, the conceptual side project of Korn's James 'Munky' Shaffer. This collaboration resulted in releasing an EDM track 'Situation'.

Film scores and other projects

 In This Gray Place - USA, 2018 - directed by R.D.Womack II
 Suicide for Beginners - USA, 2018 - directed by Craig Thieman
 The Wounds We Cannot See - USA, 2017 - directed by Alexander Freeman
 Just Coffee - USA, 2017 - directed by Matt Dressel
 Happy Birthday - USA, 2017 - directed by Kyle Kelley
 Hello - USA, 2017 - directed by Ty Jones
 Night Shift - POL, 2016 - project commissioned by Warsaw Uprising Museum
 Metanoia - Australia, 2016 - directed by Quanith Illahi
 Going Up - USA, 2016 - directed by Alexander Freeman
 Image of the Enemy - USA, 2015 - directed by Leo Lopez III
 The Bag - USA, 2015 - directed by Alexander Freeman
 The Last Taboo - USA, 2013 - directed by Alexander Freeman
 Seven Days - USA, 2013 - directed by Alexander Freeman
 Play Time - USA, 2013 - directed by Alexander Freeman
 Face Time - USA, 2013 - directed by Rod Dixon

Awards and nominations 
 Outstanding Achievement Award - Calcutta International Cult Film Festival 2017
 Best Original Music/Score - Winner - Los Angeles Independent Film Festival Awards 2016
 Music Score - Award of Recognition - Hollywood International Moving Pictures Film Festival 2016
 Music Score - Award of Recognition - Hollywood International Independent Documentary Awards 2016
 ORIGINAL SCORE FOR A DOCUMENTARY FEATURE (Nomination) - 2017 Reel Music Awards

Discography 
As Miro Kepinski
 一 (single) - 2016
 Where are You? (single) - 2016
 The Wounds We Cannot See (OST) - 2016
 Deep Trip (EP) - 2016
 Endless Sacrifice (EP) - 2016
 The Kraken (OST) - 2016
 Primal Time (EP) - 2016
 Shaped (Single) - 2016
 Elementi (EP) - 2016
As Tanana:
 Traces (EP) - 2016
 Hot Wave (single) - 2016
 Do It (single) - 2016
 Situation feat. Steve Krolikowski (single) - 2016
 Teslanation (single) - 2016
 Up (single) - 2015
 Star (EP) - 2015

As MIRO
 Be There (single) - 2015

References

External links 
Official Website
OUTCAST PRODUCTIONS

Polish film score composers
Male film score composers
Polish guitarists
1980 births
Living people
21st-century guitarists
21st-century male musicians